Sun Fung Wai, sometimes transliterated as Shun Fung Wai, is a walled village in Lam Tei, Tuen Mun District, Hong Kong.

Administration
Shun Fung Wai is a recognized village under the New Territories Small House Policy. Sun Fung Wai is one of the 36 villages represented within the Tuen Mun Rural Committee. For electoral purposes, Sun Fung Wai is part of the Tuen Mun Rural constituency.

History
Sun Fung Wai is a multi-lineage village established around 300 years ago.

See also
 Walled villages of Hong Kong, including nearby Nai Wai (adjacent), Tsing Chuen Wai and Tuen Tsz Wai

References

External links

 Delineation of area of existing village Sun Fung Wai (Tuen Mun) for election of resident representative (2019 to 2022)
 Antiquities and Monuments Office. Hong Kong Traditional Chinese Architectural Information System. Sun Fung Wai
 Antiquities Advisory Board. Historic Building Appraisal. Entrance Gate, Shun Fung Wai Picture
 Antiquities Advisory Board. Historic Building Appraisal. Shrine, Shun Fung Wai Picture
 Pictures of Sun Fung Wai and other villages of Lam Tei

Walled villages of Hong Kong
Lam Tei
Villages in Tuen Mun District, Hong Kong